"Kalimba Story" is a song by R&B band Earth, Wind & Fire released as a single in 1974 on Columbia Records.

Overview
Kalimba Story was produced by Maurice White and Joe Wissert and composed by Maurice and Verdine White. The song also came off EWF's 1974 album Open Our Eyes

Critical reception
Record World said that "What Stevie Wonder has done for the clavinet, this group does for the African thumb piano, the 'kalimba.'"

Alex Henderson of Allmusic called "Kalimba Story" a "treasure".

Chart performance
The single reached number six on the Billboard Hot Soul Singles chart, and number fifty-five on the Hot 100.

Samples
"Kalimba Story" was sampled by hip hop duo Gang Starr on their 1990 track Jazz Thing (Movie Mix).

References

1974 singles
1974 songs
Songs written by Maurice White
Songs written by Verdine White
Earth, Wind & Fire songs
Columbia Records singles
Song recordings produced by Maurice White